Everett Quinton (December 18, 1951 – January 23, 2023) was an American actor. He was the leader of the Ridiculous Theatrical Company, which he assumed after the death of his romantic partner and collaborator Charles Ludlam. He had roles in the films Natural Born Killers, Pollock, and Bros.

References

External links

1951 births
2023 deaths
20th-century American male actors
21st-century American male actors
American male stage actors
American male film actors
LGBT people from New York (state)
Gay men
Gay actors